Bobby "Boogaloo" Watts (born November 11, 1949) is an American born middleweight boxer who fought primarily in the mid-1970s.  Born in Sumter County, South Carolina in a small town named Rembert, Bobby Watts came to Philadelphia at age 10 and began boxing at the urging of his cousin, future heavyweight contender Jimmy Young.

"Boogaloo" is most famously known for defeating Marvelous Marvin Hagler, scoring a controversial 10-round majority decision on January 13, 1976, at The Spectrum in Philadelphia.
Among his losses were a defeat to Mustafa Hamsho, via a sixth-round knockout, in a fight that was refereed by Larry Hazzard.

He finished his career with a record of 38 wins (20 KOs), 7 losses and 1 draw. After his boxing career ended in 1982, Watts trained IBF super middleweight champion Charles Brewer and IBF world Super-Welterweight champion Buster Drayton.

Professional boxing record

|-
|align="center" colspan=8|38 Wins (20 knockouts, 18 decisions), 7 Losses (6 knockouts, 1 decision), 1 Draw 
|-
| align="center" style="border-style: none none solid solid; background: #e3e3e3"|Result
| align="center" style="border-style: none none solid solid; background: #e3e3e3"|Record
| align="center" style="border-style: none none solid solid; background: #e3e3e3"|Opponent
| align="center" style="border-style: none none solid solid; background: #e3e3e3"|Type
| align="center" style="border-style: none none solid solid; background: #e3e3e3"|Round
| align="center" style="border-style: none none solid solid; background: #e3e3e3"|Date
| align="center" style="border-style: none none solid solid; background: #e3e3e3"|Location
| align="center" style="border-style: none none solid solid; background: #e3e3e3"|Notes
|-align=center
|Loss
|
|align=left| Mark Kaylor
|TKO
|4
|03/05/1983
|align=left| Wembley Arena, Wembley, London, United Kingdom
|align=left|
|-
|Win
|
|align=left| Dennis "The Menace" Roberts
|KO
|5
|02/09/1982
|align=left| Hershey Sports Arena, Hershey, Pennsylvania, United States
|align=left|
|-
|Win
|
|align=left| Fred "Flintstone" Reed
|KO
|6
|13/02/1982
|align=left| Camden, South Carolina, United States
|align=left|
|-
|Win
|
|align=left| Lonnie Wilcox
|KO
|1
|26/12/1981
|align=left| Camden Municipal Arena, Camden, South Carolina, United States
|align=left|
|-
|Win
|
|align=left| Willie Ray Taylor
|KO
|7
|10/11/1981
|align=left| Spartanburg, South Carolina, United States
|align=left|
|-
|Loss
|
|align=left| Marvelous Marvin Hagler
|TKO
|2
|19/04/1980
|align=left| Cumberland County Civic Center, Portland, Maine, United States
|align=left|
|-
|Win
|
|align=left| Fred "Thump" Johnson
|KO
|3
|01/02/1980
|align=left| Philadelphia Spectrum, Philadelphia, Pennsylvania, United States
|align=left|
|-
|Win
|
|align=left| Clifford Wills
|TKO
|3
|30/10/1979
|align=left| Upper Darby Forum, Upper Darby, Pennsylvania, United States
|align=left|
|-
|Win
|
|align=left| Norberto Rufino Cabrera
|PTS
|8
|02/12/1978
|align=left| Marsala Sports Palace, Marsala, Italy
|align=left|
|-
|Loss
|
|align=left| Mustafa Hamsho
|TKO
|6
|21/09/1978
|align=left| Jersey City, New Jersey, United States
|align=left|
|-
|Win
|
|align=left| Johnny Heard
|PTS
|10
|03/06/1978
|align=left| Baltimore Civic Center, Baltimore, Maryland, United States
|align=left|
|-
|Loss
|
|align=left| David "Chevy" Love
|TKO
|4
|27/03/1977
|align=left| Randolph AFB, San Antonio, Texas, United States
|align=left|
|-
|Win
|
|align=left| Reggie Ford
|UD
|10
|22/01/1977
|align=left| Pensacola Civic Auditorium, Pensacola, Florida, United States
|align=left|
|-
|Win
|
|align=left| Casey Gacic
|TKO
|7
|14/07/1976
|align=left| Philadelphia Convention Hall, Philadelphia, Pennsylvania, United States
|align=left|
|-
|Win
|
|align=left| Ernie Burns
|TKO
|2
|10/05/1976
|align=left| Philadelphia Arena, Philadelphia, Pennsylvania, United States
|align=left|
|-
|Win
|
|align=left| Marvelous Marvin Hagler
|MD
|10
|13/01/1976
|align=left| Philadelphia Spectrum, Philadelphia, Pennsylvania, United States
|align=left|
|-
|Win
|
|align=left| James "Sweet" Marshall
|TKO
|9
|16/09/1975
|align=left| Philadelphia Spectrum, Philadelphia, Pennsylvania, United States
|align=left|
|-
|Win
|
|align=left| Willie "The Worm" Monroe
|UD
|10
|12/11/1974
|align=left| Philadelphia Spectrum, Philadelphia, Pennsylvania, United States
|align=left|
|-
|Win
|
|align=left| Eugene "Cyclone" Hart
|KO
|1
|15/07/1974
|align=left| Philadelphia Spectrum, Philadelphia, Pennsylvania, United States
|align=left|
|-
|Win
|
|align=left| Mario Rosa
|SD
|10
|17/12/1973
|align=left| Felt Forum, New York City, United States
|align=left|
|-
|Win
|
|align=left| Carlos Alberto Salinas
|TKO
|8
|08/10/1973
|align=left| Philadelphia Spectrum, Philadelphia, Pennsylvania, United States
|align=left|
|-
|Win
|
|align=left| Manuel "Manny" Gonzalez
|UD
|10
|23/07/1973
|align=left| Philadelphia Convention Hall, Philadelphia, Pennsylvania, United States
|align=left|
|-
|Win
|
|align=left| Don Cobbs
|KO
|3
|24/05/1973
|align=left| Philadelphia Arena, Philadelphia, Pennsylvania, United States
|align=left|
|-
|Win
|
|align=left| Gary Broughton
|PTS
|10
|09/04/1973
|align=left| Philadelphia Arena, Philadelphia, Pennsylvania, United States
|align=left|
|-
|Win
|
|align=left| Willie "Sweetwater" Warren
|UD
|10
|05/03/1973
|align=left| Philadelphia Spectrum, Philadelphia, Pennsylvania, United States
|align=left|
|-
|Loss
|
|align=left| Don Cobbs
|KO
|2
|20/11/1972
|align=left| Philadelphia Spectrum, Philadelphia, Pennsylvania, United States
|align=left|
|-
|Win
|
|align=left| Alvin Phillips
|UD
|10
|20/10/1972
|align=left| Madison Square Garden, New York City, United States
|align=left|
|-
|Win
|
|align=left| Ralph Palladin
|TKO
|6
|20/06/1972
|align=left| Baltimore Convention Center, Baltimore, Maryland, United States
|align=left|
|-
|Draw
|
|align=left| Ralph Palladin
|PTS
|10
|05/04/1972
|align=left| Catholic Youth Center, Scranton, Pennsylvania, United States
|align=left|
|-
|Win
|
|align=left| Ralph Palladin
|PTS
|10
|01/12/1971
|align=left| Catholic Youth Center, Scranton, Pennsylvania, United States
|align=left|
|-
|Win
|
|align=left| Roy "Smoky" Edmonds
|TKO
|5
|08/10/1971
|align=left| Felt Forum, New York City, United States
|align=left|
|-
|Win
|
|align=left| Luis Vinales
|PTS
|10
|21/09/1971
|align=left| Philadelphia Spectrum, Philadelphia, Pennsylvania, United States
|align=left|
|-
|Win
|
|align=left| Junius Hinton
|KO
|5
|10/08/1971
|align=left| Philadelphia Spectrum, Philadelphia, Pennsylvania, United States
|align=left|
|-
|Win
|
|align=left| Julio Figueroa
|UD
|8
|07/06/1971
|align=left| The Blue Horizon, Philadelphia, Pennsylvania, United States
|align=left|
|-
|Win
|
|align=left| Perry Abney
|TKO
|7
|29/04/1971
|align=left| Philadelphia Arena, Philadelphia, Pennsylvania, United States
|align=left|
|-
|Win
|
|align=left| Roy "Smoky" Edmonds
|PTS
|6
|09/02/1971
|align=left| The Blue Horizon, Philadelphia, Pennsylvania, United States
|align=left|
|-
|Win
|
|align=left|Ken Robbins
|KO
|1
|24/11/1970
|align=left| The Blue Horizon, Philadelphia, Pennsylvania, United States
|align=left|
|-
|Loss
|
|align=left| Armando Muniz
|PTS
|6
|03/09/1970
|align=left| Olympic Auditorium, Los Angeles, California, United States
|align=left|
|-
|Loss
|
|align=left| Clarence "Butch" Geigger
|TKO
|6
|25/04/1970
|align=left| Las Vegas, Nevada, United States
|align=left|
|-
|Win
|
|align=left|"Real Mean" Joe Greene
|KO
|2
|25/03/1970
|align=left| Silver Slipper, Las Vegas, Nevada, United States
|align=left|
|-
|Win
|
|align=left| Tommy Shaffer
|PTS
|6
|11/11/1969
|align=left| The Blue Horizon, Philadelphia, Pennsylvania, United States
|align=left|
|-
|Win
|
|align=left| Leroy "Hurricane" Roberts
|PTS
|6
|14/10/1969
|align=left| The Blue Horizon, Philadelphia, Pennsylvania, United States
|align=left|
|-
|Win
|
|align=left|Ron "Boom Boom" Nesby
|PTS
|6
|30/09/1969
|align=left| The Blue Horizon, Philadelphia, Pennsylvania, United States
|align=left|
|-
|Win
|
|align=left| Carlos Byrd
|KO
|2
|30/06/1969
|align=left| Washington National Arena, Washington, District of Columbia, United States
|align=left|
|-
|Win
|
|align=left| Alberto Millan
|TKO
|4
|28/03/1969
|align=left| Steelworkers Hall, Baltimore, Maryland, United States
|align=left|
|-
|Win
|
|align=left| Teddy Cooper
|PTS
|6
|13/03/1969
|align=left| Steelworkers Hall, Baltimore, Maryland, United States
|align=left|
|}

References

External links 
 
 
 Interview with Bobby ‘Boogaloo’ Watts: One of Philly’s Finest!
 

Living people
1949 births
People from Sumter County, South Carolina
Boxers from Philadelphia
Middleweight boxers
American male boxers